Trilogy is an American men's 3-on-3 basketball team that plays in the BIG3. Trilogy won the inaugural season of the BIG 3 in 2017, completing a perfect season.

2017

Draft

Current roster

References

Big3 teams
Basketball teams established in 2017
2017 establishments in the United States